Time to Remember is a 1962 British crime film directed by Charles Jarrott and starring Yvonne Monlaur, Harry H. Corbett and Robert Rietty.

Part of the Edgar Wallace Mysteries film series made at Merton Park Studios, it is loosely based on the 1915 novel The Man Who Bought London.

Cast

References

Bibliography
 Goble, Alan. The Complete Index to Literary Sources in Film. Walter de Gruyter, 1999.

External links

1962 films
British crime films
1962 crime films
1960s English-language films
Films set in England
Merton Park Studios films
Films directed by Charles Jarrott
Films based on British novels
Edgar Wallace Mysteries
1962 directorial debut films
1960s British films